José Augusto da Silva Curvo (27 August 1949 – 20 January 2022), also known as Tampinha, was a Brazilian politician.

Biography
A member of the Social Democracy Party and later the Democratic Labour Party, he served in the Chamber of Deputies from 1991 to 1995 and again in 2016 to 2019. 

Curvo died from COVID-19 on 20 January 2022, at the age of 72.

References

1949 births
2022 deaths
20th-century Brazilian politicians
21st-century Brazilian politicians
Members of the Chamber of Deputies (Brazil) from Mato Grosso
Social Democratic Party (Brazil, 2011) politicians
Democratic Labour Party (Brazil) politicians
People from Cuiabá
Deaths from the COVID-19 pandemic in Mato Grosso